Isoserine is a non-proteinogenic α-hydroxy-β-amino acid, and an isomer of serine. Non-proteinogenic amino acids do not form proteins, and are not part of the genetic code of any known organism. Isoserine has only been produced synthetically.

The first documented synthesis of isoserine in a laboratory setting was by Miyazawa et al., who published their results in 1976.

See also
 Abiogenesis
 Miller–Urey experiment

References

Non-proteinogenic amino acids
Alpha hydroxy acids